ADR or adr may refer to:

Computing
 Asynchronous DRAM refresh, an approach for persistent memory found in some Intel Xeon processors
 The adr microformat, part of the hCard microformat
 Architectural decision record
 Action–domain–responder architectural pattern
 Advanced Digital Recording, a magnetic tape data storage format.

Science and medicine
 Adiabatic demagnetization refrigeration
 Adverse drug reaction
 Astra Digital Radio, a digital radio transmission system
 Artificial disc replacement, a surgical procedure
 Adrenodoxin-NADP+ reductase, an enzyme

Transportation
 ADR (treaty), a treaty governing transport of hazardous materials
 Accident data recorder, or flight data recorder
 Active Debris Removal, an action or policy for enhancing space transport safety
 Adria Airways, an airline of Slovenia
 Airdrie railway station, United Kingdom
 Robert F. Swinnie Airport, South Carolina, United States, by IATA code

Entertainment
 Automated dialogue replacement, a post-production process in filmmaking
 Alter Der Ruine, an American powernoise music group

Companies
 Advanced Digital Radio Testing Service, Motorola's safety and compliance arm
 Applied Data Research, a large software vendor from the 1960s until the mid-1980s

Sports
 Alan Docking Racing, British motor racing team
 Alberto Del Rio (born 1977), Mexican professional wrestler
 AD Renting (cycling team), a Belgian professional cycling team that existed from 1987 to 1989

Law and finance
 Alternative dispute resolution
 American depositary receipt, a method of trading non-U.S. stocks on U.S. exchanges
 Average daily rate, a common lodging industry statistic

Other uses
 Académie de Roberval, a school in Montreal, Quebec, Canada
 Adonara language, a Central Malayo-Polynesian language of Indonesia
 ADR rose, a rose trial winner
 Alternative Democratic Reform Party, a political party in Luxembourg
 Australian Design Rules, a set of construction standards for road registered vehicles in Australia
 Automotive dead reckoning, GNSS-assisted dead reckoning for vehicles
 Azerbaijan Democratic Republic (1918–1920), a precursor state to modern Azerbaijan
 Automated Demand response (Auto-DR), the automation by electric grid utilities to curtail load for various cost savings strategies.